Henry Bolsover (31 December 1809 – 5 August 1876) was an English cricketer. Bolsover's batting style is unknown. He was born at Sheffield, Yorkshire.

Bolsover made a single first-class appearance for Sheffield against Nottingham in 1830 at Hyde Park Ground, Sheffield. In a match which Sheffield won by 41 runs, Bolsover ended Sheffield's first-innings not out on 1, while in their second-innings he was dismissed for 13 runs, stumped by Emmanuel Vincent off an unknown bowler.

He died at Llandudno, Caernarvonshire, Wales on 5 August 1876.

References

External links
Henry Bolsover at ESPNcricinfo
Henry Bolsover at CricketArchive

1809 births
1876 deaths
Cricketers from Sheffield
English cricketers
Sheffield Cricket Club cricketers